Florence Gaub (born 1977) is a Franco-German researcher, security expert and futurist who focuses on foresight based policy formation for international relations and security policy. She worked as deputy director at the European Union Institute for Security Studies (EUISS) in Paris February 2018 until May 2022, worked as foresight advisor at the General Secretariat of the Council and is Visiting Professor at the College of Europe, member of the WEF Global Future Council on the Future of Complex Risks as well as founder and president of a think-tank and consultancy, Futurate Institute.

Early life and education 
Gaub studied political science at Ludwig Maximilian University of Munich (MA, 1997-2002) and part of these studies at Paris Sorbonne University (DEA, 2003-2004). 

She obtained a PhD in International Politics from Humboldt University, Berlin, in 2009 with a dissertation on "Multiethnic armies and civil war: the cases of Nigeria, Lebanon and Bosnia-Herzegovina", for which she spent considerable time in the field and which was later also published as a book for Routledge in 2010.

Career
From 2009 till 2013 she worked at the NATO Defense College in Rome, coordinating Middle East research and conducting training courses for military officers from Arab countries.
In 2013 Gaub joined the EUISS as head of the Middle East and North Africa programme where she was promoted to Deputy Director in 2018 and built up foresight capacities and capabilities until leaving the Institute in May 2022.

Gaub specializes in strategic foresight and matters of international security, advising high level decision makers in governments and IOs such as NATO, OSCE, UN or of course, at EU level. From 2012 till 2015 she was also a reserve officer in the French army with the rank of major. She also taught at the University of Potsdam and at Sciences Po in Paris. Raised in Munich, Gaub interned in the cabinets of German politicians from Bavaria, Ludwig Wörner in 2002 and Axel Berg in 2007-2008.Since 2020 Gaub has been vice-president at the European Forum Alpbach. 
In the same year she joined the World Economic Forum's Global Future Council on Frontier Risks and from 2023-2024 the Global Future Council on the Future of Complex Risks. 
Furthermore Gaub is part of the visiting faculty at the College of Europe Campus.

With regard to the 2022 Russian invasion of Ukraine Gaub has been among the notable German female security experts routinely commenting in the media and in particular German late night political talk shows. Furthermore, Gaub contributed to the understanding of the military strategy employed or the changing nature of war, published in media such as Die Zeit, Süddeutsche Zeitung and Die Welt. An interview on 12 April 2022 on the show Markus Lanz she explained the considerable losses endured by the Russian military and societal tolerance levels of violence. During this appearance, Gaub argued for a reassessment, stating that culturally Russian society does not prescribe to a liberal, post-modern sense of life, and views violence and death differently if compared to today's Germany.  Gaub detailed her theses on the need to rethink Europe's attitude or acceptance of violence in consequent writings in FAZ and Zeit and also clarified her quote in a debate setting for die Zeit, where she detailed her take on value-driven violent behaviour from domestic abuse to death penalty or loss of life by soldiers. Researchers such as Ksenia Krimer further explored this thesis in the FAZ, quoting domestic violence statistics and more.

Selected works

Books 
 Military Integration after Civil Wars. Multiethnic Armies, Identity and Post-Conflict Reconstruction. Routledge, 2010
 Guardians of the Arab State: why militaries intervene in politics. Hurst: London, 2017
 The Cauldron: NATO’s Libya Operation. Hurst: London, 2018
 The images of war in French literature. Duisburg: WiKu-Verlag Verlag für Wissenschaft und Kultur, 2008 (in German)

Articles 

 Brot, Freiheit und Gerechtigkeit, Internationale Politik, 2018  
 What if.. there is another Arab Spring? In: What if..? Scanning the horizon: 12 scenarios for 2021. Chaillot Paper 150. EUISS, 2019
 Are Middle Eastern Militaries Agents of Stability or Instability? in Seven Pillars: What Really causes Instability in the Middle East?, Michael Rubin & Brian Katulis (eds.), The AEI Press, Washington DC, December 2019, pp.83-103 
 Der Nahe und Mittlere Osten und Nordafrika 2020 In Sicherheitspolitische Jahresvorschau 2020, Bundesministerium fuer Landesverteidigung, Vienna 2020 
 What’s in A Name? Mena Flag Carriers as Instruments of Soft Power, In S. Colombo, E. Soler (Eds.), Infrastructures and Power in the Middle East and North Africa, Euromesco Joint Policy Study, No. 17, September 2020 
 L’anticipation, notamment celle du coronavirus, est une affaire de mentalité, Le Monde, 2020 
 Why Does Foresight Matter in a Time of Crisis?, Institut Montaigne,  2020 
 The EU in Action I: The Middle East and North Africa, Internationale Politik,  2021 
 How to get better at making warnings, World Economic Forum, 2021
 Thinking MENA Futures: The Next Five Years and Beyond, Middle East Institute,  2021 

 What if.. there is no Muslim Mass Migration to Europe? In: What if..not? The cost of assumption. Chaillot Paper 172. EUISS, 2022

References

1977 births
Living people
French non-fiction writers
German non-fiction writers
French political scientists
German political scientists
Ludwig Maximilian University of Munich alumni
Paris-Sorbonne University alumni
Humboldt University of Berlin alumni
Place of birth missing (living people)